Freethinkers' Pinnacle Party or Summit of Freethinkers or Freethinkers Front (Chekad-e Azadandishan) is an Iranian principalist political party founded in 2000, mostly by Islamic Azad University academics. They competed in the 2000 Iranian legislative election and were able to gain some success. In 2001 and  2005 presidential elections, they supported Abdollah Jassbi and Akbar Hashemi Rafsanjani respectively. In 2009 presidential election, the party did not support any candidates, but invited people to vote. They also have endorsed The two Societies' electoral list for the Assembly of Experts elections in 2006.

See also 
:Category:Summit of Freethinkers Party politicians

References 

Principlist political groups in Iran
Political parties established in 2000
Electoral lists for Iranian legislative election, 2004